Spondylus visayensis is a species of marine bivalve mollusc in the family Spondylidae.

Distribution
This bivalve occurs off the Philippines..

Original description
(of Spondylus gloriosus visayensis Poppe & Tagaro, 2010) Poppe G. & Tagaro S. (2010) New species of Haloceratidae, Columbellidae, Buccinidae, Mitridae, Costellariidae, Amathinidae and Spondylidae from the Philippines. Visaya 3(1):73-93.

References

 Huber M. (2015). Compendium of Bivalves 2. Harxheim: ConchBooks. 907 pp.

External links
 Worms Link

Spondylidae